David Michael Keon (born March 22, 1940) is a Canadian former professional ice hockey centre. He played professionally from 1960 to 1982, including 15 seasons with the Toronto Maple Leafs, and was inducted into the Hockey Hall of Fame in 1986. Keon was inducted into the Ontario Sports Hall of Fame in 2010. On October 16, 2016, as part of the Toronto Maple Leafs centennial celebrations, Keon was named the greatest player in the team's history. In 2017 Keon was named one of the 100 Greatest NHL Players in NHL history.

Playing career

Junior hockey
Keon played junior hockey in Toronto for the St. Michael's Buzzers of the Ontario Hockey Association's Metro Junior B league in 1956–57;
on December 20, 1956, he scored seven goals in one game. In February 1957, he was named to the league's eastern all-star team and was picked by NHL scouts as the top prospect in the league. Keon was selected as the league's rookie of the year, finishing second in scoring, and his team won the league championship. He played some games that season for the Junior A St. Michael's Majors, and moved to that club full-time for the 1957–58 season. Keon played for St. Michael's through the end of the 1960 season, when he turned professional and joined the Sudbury Wolves of the Eastern Professional Hockey League for four playoff games. They would be the only games he would ever play in the minor leagues.

Toronto Maple Leafs
Keon joined the Toronto Maple Leafs of the National Hockey League for the 1960–61 season, winning the Calder Memorial Trophy as the league's top rookie with 20 goals and 45 points in his first season. It was his first of six consecutive 20-goal seasons. In his second year in the NHL, Keon was named to the second All-Star team and won the Lady Byng Memorial Trophy as most gentlemanly player, taking only one minor penalty through the entire season. He repeated as Lady Byng winner in 1962–63, again taking only a single minor penalty all year.

He was the Leafs' leading scorer in the 1963–64, 1966–67 and 1969–70 seasons, and the team's top goal-scorer in 1970–71 and 1972–73. Keon was considered one of the fastest skaters in the NHL, and one of the best defensive forwards of his era. He would usually play against the opposing team's top centre, and developed a reputation for neutralizing some of the league's top scorers. In 1970–71, he scored eight shorthanded goals, setting an NHL record for most shorthanded goals scored in a single season, which would later be broken by Marcel Dionne in 1974–75, with 10 shorthanded goals (Dionne's record would be broken by Wayne Gretzky in 1983–84 with 12 shorthanded goals. In turn, Gretzky's record would be broken by Mario Lemieux in 1988–89, when Lemieux scored 13 shorthanded goals in a season).

Keon won four Stanley Cups with the Leafs, playing on the Cup-winning teams of 1961–62, 1962–63, 1963–64 and 1966–67. In the 1967 Cup Final, he shut down Jean Béliveau, the star centreman of the Montreal Canadiens, in the last two games of the series and was voted the most valuable player of the playoffs, winning the Conn Smythe Trophy. Keon's eight points is the fewest ever by a non-goalie Conn Smythe winner, and he remains the only Leaf to have won the trophy named for the former owner of the club.

He was named team captain on October 31, 1969, succeeding George Armstrong who was said to be retiring from hockey. Armstrong returned to the Leafs two weeks later and played for another two seasons, but Keon remained captain and would wear the C through the rest of his years with the Leafs.

Keon hoped to make Team Canada for the 1972 Summit Series, but was coming off one of the worst years of his career, finishing the 1971–72 season with his lowest points-per-game average since his rookie year. The final pick for Team Canada came down between Keon and Bobby Clarke. It is believed that Clarke was selected because he had more points.

While Keon was not selected for Team Canada, the Ottawa Nationals of the World Hockey Association made a strong effort to sign Keon, whom they had placed on their negotiation list earlier that year. Harold Ballard, who had become the Leafs' majority owner in March 1972, said that Keon did not provide the leadership the team needed during the previous season and was refusing to give Keon a big salary increase after a poor year. Keon signed a letter of intent with the Nationals, and received a $50,000 cheque from the team, but the deal fell apart just before training camp. Keon signed a three-year deal with the Leafs, and rebounded strongly in 1972–73, scoring 37 goals. On November 22, 1972, he scored his 297th goal as a Leaf, passing Armstrong and Frank Mahovlich to become the team's all-time leading goal scorer.

Early into the 1974–75 season, Ballard publicly blasted Keon, saying that the team was not getting good leadership from its captain and vowing never again to agree to a no-trade clause in a contract, as he had with Keon. When Keon's contract expired at the end of the season, Ballard made it clear that there was no place for him on the Leafs. The Leafs believed they had some strong young prospects at centre who needed more ice time, and Keon was again asking for a contract with a no-trade clause. The 35-year-old Keon was told he could make his own deal with another NHL team, but any club signing him would have been required to provide compensation to the Leafs. Ballard set the compensation price so high that other teams shied away from signing him, even though the Leafs had no intention of keeping him.  In effect, Ballard had blocked Keon from going to another NHL team.

WHA
In August 1975, with the Leafs still controlling his NHL rights, Keon jumped to the World Hockey Association, signing a deal with the Minnesota Fighting Saints reportedly worth $300,000 over two seasons. The head coach of the Saints was Harry Neale, an old friend of Keon's. The team, and Keon, played well, but the team struggled badly financially. With 21 games left in the season, the team folded. Keon was expected to return to the NHL and was not included in the dispersal sale of Saints players to other WHA teams. The NHL's New York Islanders wanted Keon, but needed to negotiate a deal for his NHL rights with the Leafs. Again, the Leafs' asking price (said to have been a first-round draft pick) was too high, and a disappointed Keon signed with the WHA's Indianapolis Racers in March 1976.

The Fighting Saints were revived for the start of the WHA's 1976–77 season, and Keon was traded back to Minnesota, but the team folded for good halfway through the season (with Keon as its leading scorer). Keon was briefly the property of the Edmonton Oilers who immediately traded him to the New England Whalers in January 1977.

Return to NHL
He would remain with the Whalers through the rest of his career. In the 1977–78 season, Keon was joined on the Whalers by Gordie Howe who, at age 50, was the team's leading scorer that season. Keon returned to the NHL in 1979 when the renamed Hartford Whalers became one of four WHA teams to join the NHL. The merger agreement allowed existing NHL teams to reclaim most of the WHA players whose NHL rights they held. Nevertheless, even though Keon was not protected from reclamation by the Whalers in the reclamation draft, the Maple Leafs declined to reclaim their former captain, allowing him to remain in Hartford. Bobby Hull joined the Whalers that season, with Keon, Howe, and Hull sometimes playing as a forward line. Howe and Hull retired at the end of the season. Terry Harper's retirement in 1981 left Keon as the oldest active player in the NHL. Keon played two more seasons with the Whalers and announced his retirement on June 30, 1982, at age 42. Keon was the last active player who played an full season in the Original Six era.

Retirement
Following his retirement from hockey, Keon moved to Florida and worked in real estate for several years.

Bitter over his treatment by Ballard and the Leafs, Keon refused for many years to have any relationship with the Leafs organization, even after Ballard's death and after the club changed ownership several times. Other Leaf players who clashed with Ballard's management did reconcile, most notably Keon's successor as club captain, Darryl Sittler, who accepted an invitation from GM Cliff Fletcher to return as a consultant after the team came under the ownership of Steve Stavro.

Keon turned down several offers of reconciliation from the team, including an invitation to the closing ceremony for Maple Leaf Gardens in 1999 and a proposed ceremony to honour his number.

On March 22, 1991, with the Leafs under new management after Ballard's death, Keon played on a team of Leaf all-stars against their counterparts from the Montreal Canadiens in an old-timers game at Maple Leaf Gardens called Legends' Night in Canada. "After that, I figured out the new ownership was no different than Ballard, and I had no use for it," Keon later said. In 2005, he told the Toronto Sun that the new owners (majority equity owned by the Ontario Teachers' Pension Plan, chaired by Larry Tanenbaum) "would like to say they are different, but they are all the same."

In January 2007, the Toronto Maple Leafs announced that Keon would attend a pre-game ceremony to honour its 1967 Stanley Cup-winning team. Keon was one of several members of the 1967 team to appear on-ice at the Air Canada Centre before the Leafs' game on February 17, 2007 — the 80th anniversary of the first game played by the Toronto franchise after being renamed the Maple Leafs in 1927.  Keon was introduced to the crowd second last, just prior to 1967 captain George Armstrong, and received a long standing ovation.  On February 16, 2013, Keon was a part of a pre-game ceremony honouring the 1963 Stanley Cup-winning Leafs team.  He similarly appeared on February 8, 2014, with other members of the 1964 Cup winners.

His granddaughter, Kaitlyn Keon, played on the Brown Bears women's ice hockey program from 2011 to 2015, accumulating 34 points.

On January 21, 2016, it was announced that Keon, along with former Maple Leafs Turk Broda and Tim Horton, would be commemorated with a statue on Legends Row in front of the Air Canada Centre, joining former Maple Leafs greats Syl Apps, Teeder Kennedy, Johnny Bower, George Armstrong, Darryl Sittler, Borje Salming, and Mats Sundin.

On October 14, 2016, the Toronto Maple Leafs released their list of the top 100 Leafs of all time.  Based on the votes of fans and a 31-member expert panel, Keon was voted the greatest Toronto Maple Leaf.

On October 15, 2016, the Maple Leafs retired Dave Keon's number 14 at a ceremony honouring the Maple Leafs' centenary.

Awards and honours
 Calder Memorial Trophy: 1961
 Lady Byng Memorial Trophy: 1962, 1963
 NHL second All-Star team: 1962, 1971
 NHL All-Star Game: 1962, 1963, 1964, 1967, 1968, 1970, 1971, 1973
 Stanley Cup: 1962, 1963, 1964, 1967
 J. P. Bickell Cup: 1962, 1963
 Conn Smythe Trophy: 1967
 Paul Deneau Trophy: 1977, 1978
 Hockey Hall of Fame: 1986
 In 1998, Keon was ranked number 69 on The Hockey News' list of the 100 Greatest Hockey Players
 The Aréna Dave Keon in Rouyn-Noranda, Quebec is named in his honour
 Inaugural member of the World Hockey Association Hall of Fame in the "Legends of the game" category: 2010
 Statue on Toronto's Legends Row in front of Scotiabank Arena.
 Greatest Toronto Maple Leaf
 #14 jersey retired by the Toronto Maple Leafs.
 In January, 2017, Keon was commemorated as one of the 100 Greatest NHL Players.
 In 2018, Keon was inducted into the Canada's Sports Hall of Fame.

Career statistics

Regular season and playoffs

* Stanley Cup Champion.

See also
Captain (ice hockey)
List of NHL players with 1000 games played

References

External links

One for the Ages: Dave Keon's 1979-80 NHL Season

1940 births
Living people
Anglophone Quebec people
Calder Trophy winners
Canadian ice hockey centres
Conn Smythe Trophy winners
Hartford Whalers captains
Hartford Whalers players
Hockey Hall of Fame inductees
Ice hockey people from Quebec
Indianapolis Racers players
Lady Byng Memorial Trophy winners
Minnesota Fighting Saints players
New England Whalers players
Sportspeople from Rouyn-Noranda
Stanley Cup champions
Toronto Maple Leafs players
Toronto St. Michael's Majors players